Been There, Done That is the second album by Eddie and The Hot Rods of new material from the then current line-up featuring Barrie Masters. The album was released in the United Kingdom in 2006 on Voiceprint Records.

Track listing
"Why Should I Care?" (Richard Holgarth) - 4:21
"Go Drive It" (Dipster Dean, Barrie Masters) - 3:00
"Gotta Give It Up" (Simon Bowley, Dean, Chris Taylor) - 5:51
"Belgian Tom's Hat-trick" (Micky Moody) - 2:48
"You Are My Drug" (Bowley, Dean, Masters) - 3:11
"Hole in the Head" (Holgarth) - 2:38
"You Should Have Been There" (Phil Mitchell) - 3:17
"All I Want (Is All I See)" (Bowley, Holgarth) - 3:24
"All This Time" (Bowley, Holgarth) - 3:23
"Really Happy Now" (Bowley, Dean, Taylor) - 3:50
"Yeah, Yeah, Yeah" (Bowley, Dean) - 2:29
"Look What She's Doing" (Holgarth) - 3:30
"Stop" (Holgarth) - 4:54
"Born to Be Wild" (Mars Bonfire) - 4:01

Personnel
Eddie and the Hot Rods
Barrie Masters - vocals
Richard Holgarth - guitar, keyboards, backing vocals
Chris Taylor - guitar, backing vocals
Dipster Dean - bass guitar, backing vocals
Simon Bowley - drums, backing vocals

References

External links

Eddie And The Hot Rods

2006 albums
Eddie and the Hot Rods albums